Colin Archibald (born 20 October 1996) is a Nevisian professional cricketer. He made his List A debut on 15 November 2019, for the Leeward Islands in the 2019–20 Regional Super50 tournament. He made his first-class debut on 9 January 2020, for the Leeward Islands in the 2019–20 West Indies Championship.

In July 2020, he was named in the St Kitts & Nevis Patriots squad for the 2020 Caribbean Premier League (CPL). He made his Twenty20 debut on 3 September 2020, for the St Kitts & Nevis Patriots in the 2020 CPL.

In May 2022, in the fourth round of the 2021–22 West Indies Championship, Archibald scored his maiden century in first-class cricket.

References

External links
 

1996 births
Living people
Leeward Islands cricketers
St Kitts and Nevis Patriots cricketers
Nevisian cricketers
Place of birth missing (living people)